The 2018 Syracuse Orange football team represented Syracuse University during the 2018 NCAA Division I FBS football season. The Orange were led by third-year head coach Dino Babers and played their home games at the Carrier Dome. They competed as members of the Atlantic Division of the Atlantic Coast Conference. After being picked to finish last in the preseason media poll, Syracuse went 10–3, 6–2 in ACC play to finish in 2nd place in the Atlantic Division. They were invited to the Camping World Bowl, where they defeated West Virginia.

Previous season
The Orange finished the 2017 season 4–8, 2–6 in ACC play to finish in last place in the Atlantic Division.

Recruiting

Position key

Recruits

The Orange signed a total of 18 recruits.

Preseason

Award watch lists
Listed in the order that they were released

ACC media poll
The ACC media poll was released on July 24, 2018.

Schedule

Schedule Source:

Rankings

Game summaries

at Western Michigan

Wagner

Florida State

UConn

at Clemson

at Pittsburgh

North Carolina

NC State

at Wake Forest

Louisville

vs. Notre Dame

at Boston College

vs. West Virginia (Camping World Bowl)

2019 NFL Draft

References

Syracuse
Syracuse Orange football seasons
Cheez-It Bowl champion seasons
Syracuse football